The Dothan Formation is a geologic formation consisting mostly of lithic greywacke (sandstone), but also including chert, mudstone, greensand formed from volcanic pillow lava, and to a minor degree, granitic cobble. It preserves fossils dating between the Late Cretaceous to the Late Jurassic period. It occurs along the Oregon coast in Curry county. It ranges approximately 12 miles from Winchuck River just north of the state line of California to Whalehead Cove to the north, and inward to the southern area of the city of Roseburg.

See also

 List of fossiliferous stratigraphic units in Oregon
 Paleontology in Oregon

References

Cretaceous geology of Oregon